Burlington is a city in Racine and Walworth counties in the U.S. state of Wisconsin, with the majority of the city located in Racine County. The population of the city was 11,047 as of the 2020 census.

History
Prior to the arrival of Europeans in the area, Native American mounds were constructed near the present location of Burlington. For example, around 1830, a small Potawatomi village stood in what is now the Town of Burlington, though it wasn't larger than the present-day city.

The earliest certain European presence in what is now Burlington was in the fall of 1799, when a group of French explorers and missionaries led by Francis Morgan de Vereceones made a portage from the Root River to the Fox River, reaching the Fox at approximately Burlington's present location.

The first European settlers in Burlington were Moses Smith (the son of a Revolutionary War veteran) and William Whiting. Smith and Whiting had been in the area previously, making a so-called "jackknife claim" to the land (carving their names and the date on trees in the vicinity) on December 15, 1835. The men then left the encampment and returned with Lemuel Smith (Moses' brother) as well as Benjamin Perce, another member of the group. The four men searched for arable land and built a cabin on the east side of the Fox River (on what is now Wehmhoff-Jucker Park.) Other settlers arrived in the spring and summer of 1836, mostly from New England; they named their settlement Foxville. That year, the residents of Foxville unanimously decided to change their settlement's name to "Burlington" after the city Burlington, Vermont; the Foxville name continued to be used, however, until that name was officially changed on July 15, 1839.

Since its establishment, Foxville had been in Michigan Territory. On July 3, 1836, however, an act of Congress organizing the Wisconsin Territory went into effect, and Foxville fell within the borders of Milwaukee County, Wisconsin Territory, which at that time included the present-day county of Racine. The two counties separated on December 7, 1836, and Foxville ended up in Racine County. The first post office in Foxville was created on March 21, 1837, with Moses Smith, one of the four founders of the city, as the first postmaster. In May 1837, a sawmill (the first frame building in the settlement) and a dam on the Fox River were completed.

On January 2, 1838, Rochester township, which included Foxville as well as all of Racine County west of Mount Pleasant, was established. On March 9, 1839, Burlington township (including at the time what is now the Town of Dover) and much of Brighton were separated from Rochester.

Burlington was a major New England settlement.  The original founders of Burlington consisted entirely of settlers from New England, and inherited "Yankee" culture, that is, they were descended from the English Puritans who settled New England in the 1600s. They were part of a wave of New England farmers who headed west into what was then the wilds of the Northwest Territory during the early 1800s.  Most of them arrived as a result of the completion of the Erie Canal. When they originally arrived in the area, there was nothing but dense virgin forest and wild prairie. The settlers laid out farms, constructed roads, erected government buildings and established post routes.  They brought with them many of their "Yankee" New England values, such as staunch support for abolitionism as well as a passion for education and the subsequent construction of many schools. They were mostly members of the Congregationalist Church, though some were Episcopalian. Due to the second Great Awakening some of them had converted to Methodism before moving to what is now Burlington. Burlington, like much of Wisconsin, would be culturally similar to early New England for most of its early history.

From 1844 to 1850, the town of Voree, just to the west of Burlington, was the headquarters of the Church of Jesus Christ of Latter Day Saints (Strangite), one of many sects founded during the LDS succession crisis following the death of Latter Day Saint movement founder Joseph Smith. Although James Strang's group relocated to Beaver Island, Michigan in 1850, his parents remained in Voree. After Strang was shot by two disgruntled members in 1856, he was taken to Voree where he died. He is buried in a cemetery in Burlington. Strang's church still maintains a congregation in Voree to this day, and the local historical society has erected a monument to the Mormon settlement there.

Burlington was incorporated as a village in 1886; in 1900 it became a city.

Geography and climate

Burlington is located at  (42.677945, −88.278279).

Demographics

2010 census
As of the census of 2010, there were 10,464 people, 4,240 households, and 2,702 families residing in the city. The racial makeup of the city was 92.8% White, 0.9% African American, 0.4% Native American, 1.1% Asian, 3.4% from other races, and 1.5% from two or more races. Hispanic or Latino of any race were 8.6% of the population.

There were 4,240 households, of which 32.8% had children under the age of 18 living with them, 47.4% were married couples living together, 11.5% had a female householder with no husband present, 4.8% had a male householder with no wife present, and 36.3% were non-families. 30.3% of all households were made up of individuals, and 12.9% had someone living alone who was 65 years of age or older. The average household size was 2.43 and the average family size was 3.03.

The median age in the city was 38.6 years. 25.4% of residents were under the age of 18; 7.9% were between the ages of 18 and 24; 25.5% were from 25 to 44; 26.2% were from 45 to 64; and 15% were 65 years of age or older. The gender makeup of the city was 47.7% male and 52.3% female.

2000 census
As of the census of 2000, there were 9,936 people, 3,838 households, and 2,590 families residing in the city. The population density was 1,667.9 people per square mile (643.7/km2). There were 3,976 housing units at an average density of 667.4 per square mile (257.6/km2). The racial makeup of the city was 95.89% White, 0.37% Black or African American, 0.12% Native American, 0.55% Asian, 2.21% from other races, and 0.85% from two or more races. Hispanic or Latino of any race were 4.65% of the population.

There were 1,838 households, out of which 36.3% had children under the age of 18 living with them, 52.8% were married couples living together, 10.4% had a female householder with no husband present, and 32.5% were non-families. 27.5% of all households were made up of individuals, and 10.9% had someone living alone who was 65 years of age or older. The average household size was 2.52 and the average family size was 3.10.

In the city, the population was spread out, with 27.8% under the age of 18, 9.0% from 18 to 24, 29.5% from 25 to 44, 19.8% from 45 to 64, and 13.9% who were 65 years of age or older. The median age was 35 years. For every 100 females, there were 92.4 males. For every 100 females age 18 and over, there were 87.6 males.

The median income for a household in the city was $43,365, and the median income for a family was $54,045. Males had a median income of $38,471 versus $25,082 for females. The per capita income for the city was $21,789. About 3.7% of families and 5.1% of the population were below the poverty line, including 5.2% of those under age 18 and 4.7% of those age 65 or over.

Economy

Breweries 

 Burlington Brewing Company
 Van Merritt Brewing Company
 Wisconsin Brewing Company
 Finke and Uhen Brewery

Government

Burlington has a mayor-council form of government, with a city administrator.  The mayor is the city's chief executive, responsible for seeing that state law and city ordinances are enforced.  Mayors are elected to two-year terms; the current mayor is Jeannie Hefty.

The Common Council is composed of eight aldermen, two in each of Burlington's four districts.  In every year's spring election, one alderman is elected from each district. Aldermen serve two-year terms.

The city administrator is appointed by the Common Council to oversee the routine operations of the city.

, the Burlington Police Department employed 17 full-time officers; Starting 2020, the Fire Department employs EMT/Firefighters to staff the station full-time, and also has over 30 volunteer Firefighter/EMT's.

Education
The first school classes in Burlington were taught in 1838. One of the first teachers was William P. Lyon, later a Justice of the Supreme Court of Wisconsin. The settlement's first schoolhouse was built in 1839, and classes were taught there irregularly for the next 15 years. An act of the Wisconsin Legislature in 1857 incorporated the Burlington Union School District of Racine County. In 1858 and 1859, a schoolhouse was built for the district's use. Now called Lincoln School (Burlington, Wisconsin), the building is now used as the headquarters for the Burlington Area School District. Early quarrels about the management and costs of the school led to the creation of two rival school boards, each claiming to be legal; a new board gained control in 1861, and lasting stability came to the system in 1872.

Burlington is now served by the Burlington Area School District. The district has eight schools, six in Burlington. Elementary schools include:
Cooper Elementary,
Waller Elementary,
Winkler Elementary
and Lyons Center.
Middle schools include:
Karcher Middle School
and Dyer Intermediate. A campus of the Gateway Technical College is also in Burlington.

Private and parochial schools
Burlington's first private school, the Burlington Academy, was founded in 1844 as a result of dissatisfaction with the other schools operating at the time. One of its early teachers was John F. Potter, later a Congressman from Wisconsin.  The Burlington Academy no longer operates.

Private and parochial schools in Burlington include:
 St. Charles Elementary School
 St. John's Lutheran School
 St. Mary's Elementary School
 Catholic Central High School

Burlington is the home of the U.S. Order of Friars Minor Novitiate for Friars in Formation for religious life.

Culture
Burlington is nicknamed "Chocolate City, U.S.A.", because of the Nestlé chocolate factory built there in 1966. It is also home to an annual Chocolate Fest on Memorial Day weekend.Since 1929, Burlington has also been the home of the Burlington Liars' Club.

Recreation 
Anglers enjoy fishing on Echo Lake and on the Fox River.

Sports 
Burlington Little League was named District 6 champions and state champions at the Majors level in 2010, 2011, 2013, 2014, and 2015.In 2006, the semi-pro football team, the Burlington Blue Devils, was established. The city is the home of the Burlington Barons, a semi-pro baseball team that is part of the Land O'Lakes League Southwest Division.  They play at Beaumont Field.

Points of Interest 
The community of Voree, home to the Church of Jesus Christ of Latter Day Saints (Strangite), is located just outside the city. The Malt House Theater, the building being the former home of the Finke-Uhen Brewery, is located along the Fox River within the city of Burlington, and the theater is home to the community theater company Haylofters, Inc. Haylofters has been in continuous operation since 1932.

Media

Newspapers 
The first newspaper in the Burlington area was the Voree Herald, published in Voree in January 1846 by James Strang, the leader of the Church of Jesus Christ of Latter Day Saints (Strangite). Its primary purpose was to inform his congregation about events in the wider Latter Day Saint movement. The paper was renamed the Gospel Herald in September 1847, and continued to be published until 1850, when most of the church relocated to Beaver Island in Lake Michigan.

The first newspaper published in Burlington intended for a general audience was the Weekly Burlington Gazette, first published on April 8, 1858. The newspaper was strongly Republican and continued until December 11, 1860, when its owner moved to Houston, Texas.

From 1860 until 1863, no newspaper was published in Burlington.  On October 14, 1863, the Burlington Standard, another Republican newspaper, was founded. In 1881, the paper became largely nonpartisan, but in April 1886, with a new owner, the paper was renamed the Standard Democrat and became strongly pro-Democrat.  From 1896 to 1911, the Standard Democrat was also published in German under the name Der Standard Demokrat.

The Burlington Democrat, a newspaper with Democratic leanings, was first published in 1880 as a counter to the Republican Burlington Standard. Its name was soon changed to the Burlington Free Press, and its leanings changed to Republican at about the same time the Standard became the Standard Democrat.

The weekly Burlington Standard Press  is currently published in Burlington; the daily Racine Journal Times, Kenosha News, and Milwaukee Journal Sentinel are also available in the area.

Radio 

WBSD (89.1 FM – http://www.wbsdfm.com/) is a high school radio station owned by the Burlington Area School District and operated by the staff and students of Burlington High School. Other radio stations serving Burlington include WLKG (96.1 FM, Lake Geneva), WLBC (101.5 FM, Slades Corners), WIIL (95.1 FM, Union Grove) and many Milwaukee-area stations.

Television 
Around 1989 Win-TV (now WIN Media, Inc. - http://www.winmediainc.com/) was created by current owner and President Shad Branen. According to their web site they began as a producer of local news and sports programming televised throughout Southeastern Wisconsin on CNN Headline News. Since then their services have expanded to include an array of multimedia services for their clients.

Transportation

Major highways 
The following highways pass through or near Burlington:

Interstate highways
  I-43 is eleven miles west of the city.
  I-94 is twenty miles east of the city.

Federal highways
  US 12 is ten miles southwest of the city.
  US 45 is thirteen miles east of the city.

Wisconsin highways
  WIS 11
  WIS 36
  WIS 50 is nine miles south of the city.
  WIS 75 is nine miles east of the city.
  WIS 83
  WIS 120 is eight miles west of the city.
  WIS 142
  WIS 164 is eight miles northeast of the city.

County highways
  Racine County Highway A
  Racine County Highway E
  Racine County Highway FF
  Racine County Highway J
  Racine County Highway P
 Racine County Highway R
  Racine County Highway W
  Walworth County Highway D
  Walworth County Highway DD

Railroads

The first railroad to pass through Burlington was built in 1855 by the Racine, Janesville and Mississippi Railroad Company.  Its construction nearly bankrupted Racine. The line was later reorganized as the Western Union Railroad and eventually incorporated into the Chicago, Milwaukee and St. Paul Railroad Company, . (better known as the Milwaukee Road)  On the Milwaukee Road, this line was referred to as the "Racine & Southwestern" Division and is often referred to as the "Southwestern" Line.

In 1856, Burlington invested in the Fox River Valley Railroad of Wisconsin, a planned railroad that would have started in Milwaukee, connected to the railroad already in Burlington, and continued on to the Fox River Valley Railroad of Illinois.  The roadbed was built, but because of the failure of the company, rails were never laid.

The railroad currently operating through Burlington was constructed in 1885–1886 by the Wisconsin Central Railroad. The Wisconsin Central was acquired by the Minneapolis St. Paul & Sault Ste. Marie Railway in 1908, and later merged with the Duluth, South Shore and Atlantic Railway in 1961 to create the Soo Line Railroad.

The Milwaukee Road operated its last train west of Burlington in 1982.  In 1985 the Soo Line purchased what remained of the Milwaukee Road, and reorganized their existing line through Burlington as a part of a new subsidiary known as Lakes States Transportation Division in 1986.  Lakes States did not achieve the cost savings that the Soo Line had envisioned and was sold to the new Wisconsin Central Transportation, which commenced operations on October 11, 1987.  The Wisconsin Central Limited was acquired by the Canadian National Railway in 2001. The Canadian National Railway remains the operator of the rail line through Burlington.

Airport
Burlington Municipal Airport (KBUU) serves Burlington and surrounding communities.

Notable people

 Alma M. Aldrich, Wisconsin State Representative
 Maurice L. Ayers, politician 
 Caleb P. Barns, lawyer
 Charles Edward Barns, writer
 Ginger Beaumont, professional baseball player
 Frank Cannella, sometimes referred to as the "father of the infomercial" industry
 William Everett Chipman, state senator
 Henry Allen Cooper, Congressman from Wisconsin's 1st congressional district
 Leander F. Frisby, lawyer
 Ed Garvey, lawyer, politician, executive director of the National Football League Players Association
 Jared Hornbeek, bassist/musician of alternative rock band, The Unlikely Candidates
 Gregory Itzin, the actor who portrays fictional president Charles Logan of TV's 24, was a former resident
 Kelly Kahl, television executive
 Bill Kazmaier, three-time World's Strongest Man winner; ESPN commentator on World's Strongest Man broadcasts
 John Longstreth, drummer of the technical death metal band Origin (band)
 William P. Lyon, Justice of the Wisconsin Supreme Court
 Paul Miller, MLB player
 George C. Mathews, member of first Securities and Exchange Commission
 Ernst Merton, Wisconsin State Senator and lawyer
 Cloyd A. Porter, Wisconsin State Representative
 Edward F. Rakow, Wisconsin State Representative
 Anthony B. Rewald, legislator
 Davis C. Rohr,  U.S. Air Force Major General
 Tony Romo, quarterback of the Dallas Cowboys, attended Burlington High School
 Braggo Roth, MLB player
 Frank Roth, MLB player
 Francis Reuschlein, Wisconsin State Representative
 Henry Schadeberg, U.S. Representative
 James T. Schuerman, Roman Catholic bishop
 Bob Steele, MLB player
 James Strang, founded the Church of Jesus Christ of Latter Day Saints (Strangite) from Voree; lawyer and member of the Michigan House of Representatives
 Chris Vos, singer/musician of Grammy-nominated alternative rock band, The Record Company
 Robin Vos, Wisconsin State Representative and 75th Speaker of the Wisconsin State Assembly
 Mary Wagner, legislator and jurist

Images

References

External links

 City of Burlington
 Burlington Chamber of Commerce
 Burlington Library

Cities in Wisconsin
Cities in Racine County, Wisconsin
Cities in Walworth County, Wisconsin
Populated places established in 1835
1835 establishments in Michigan Territory